"I'll Need Someone to Hold Me (When I Cry)" is a song written by Bob McDill and Wayland Holyfield, and originally recorded by Don Williams on his 1977 album Visions.  The song was later recorded by American country music artist Janie Fricke.  It was released in July 1981 as the third single and title track from her album I'll Need Someone to Hold Me When I Cry.  The song reached #4 on the Billboard Hot Country Singles chart and #1 on the RPM Country Tracks chart in Canada.

Charts

References

1981 singles
1977 songs
Don Williams songs
Janie Fricke songs
Songs written by Bob McDill
Songs written by Wayland Holyfield
Song recordings produced by Jim Ed Norman
Columbia Records singles